Stretch is a 2014 American comedy crime film written and directed by Joe Carnahan and starring Patrick Wilson, Ed Helms, James Badge Dale, Brooklyn Decker, Jessica Alba, and Chris Pine. Wilson portrays the title character, a struggling limousine chauffeur who finds his life in danger after he picks up a mysterious millionaire (Pine).

The film was originally scheduled to be theatrically released in the United States on March 21, 2014. However just a month prior to the date, Universal Pictures pulled it from their schedule, before eventually distributing it on video on demand on October 14, 2014.

Plot

A man nicknamed Stretch is thrown out of his car after a traffic accident in which the other driver, Candace, ignores a red light. Miraculously uninjured, he confronts Candace, only to fall instantly in love with her. A year later, Stretch is inspired to give up his addictions to cocaine and gambling. As Stretch considers proposing to her, Candace abruptly breaks up with him. Hurt by the sudden rejection, Stretch's life spirals into self-destruction and failure, which he blames on Candace. A failed actor, he works in Los Angeles as a limo driver. Though he has quit gambling, he retains a $6000 debt to Ignacio, who demands the debt be paid by midnight. At the same time, Stretch begins hallucinating the bitter ghost of another failed actor and limo driver named Karl, who committed suicide in front of a customer.

His boss, Naseem, calls him to his office and tells him that their chief competitor, a mysterious man known only as The Jovi, has been stealing their clients. Unless they can steal clients away from The Jovi, Naseem will be forced to fold his business. Although unsure how he will keep his job or pay back his debts, Stretch takes time to set up a blind date with a woman from an online dating site. At the same time, he begs Charlie, a sympathetic employee, to direct any high-paying customers his way. When The Jovi steals his first client, actor David Hasselhoff, Charlie sends Stretch to intercept one of The Jovi's clients, Ray Liotta. Liotta tasks Stretch with returning a pistol and prop badge. Before he can do so, Charlie sends him another client, Roger Karos, an eccentric millionaire with a reputation for extremist hedonism. Karos parachutes down in his underwear to the arranged location and offers to pay Stretch's gambling debt if he serves without question.

As Stretch drives Karos to exclusive nightclubs and hotspots of dubious legality, Karl berates him for putting himself at increasing risk, both personally and legally, for such a small sum of money. Karos' final destination is a secretive sex club. Karos gives Stretch 100 minutes to return to the sex club with an important briefcase and a supply of cocaine. When Stretch attempts to retrieve the briefcase, he learns from Laurent, a French blackmailer, that Karos has promised to trade a ledger for the contents of the briefcase. Using Liotta's props, Stretch cons Laurent and his men into believing that he is a police officer, and they surrender the briefcase. As he leaves the nightclub, he sees Candace and nonchalantly insinuates that he is both successful and important now. When Candace expresses interest in him, he turns her down. Unimpressed, Karl continues to harangue him for his inadequacies.

Stretch procures the cocaine from a reality television star, who then steals the limo. Meanwhile, Liotta complains to Naseem, who fires Stretch. Undeterred, Stretch reacquires the limo, which has been trashed, only to lose it to The Jovi's brother, Boris, who operates a tow truck. Stretch once again retrieves the limo, though it has been reported as stolen. Stretch fast talks the security system operator into believing that he is a cop whose life is on the line during a gunfight. Upon returning, Karos complains that Stretch is a minute late. When Ignacio also complains that he is late in his payment, Stretch instructs Ignacio to meet him at Karos' destination. There, Karos abandons Stretch to The Jovi and Boris, though Ignacio intercedes. Laurent, revealed to be an FBI agent, also appears and arrests Karos, who is wanted for embezzlement. As Karos prepares to kill Laurent in a sneak attack, Stretch creates a diversion, saves Laurent's life, and escapes.

Later, at a diner, Stretch gives the ledger to Laurent, who declines to arrest him and compliments his acting skills. As Stretch looks around the diner, he realizes that he has ended up at the meeting point he set up with his blind date. He is surprised to find that the woman is there; when she is revealed to be Charlie, the two laugh and kiss.

Cast 
 Patrick Wilson as Kevin "Stretch" Brzyzowski, a down on his luck limo driver and aspiring actor in debt to a Mexican gang.
 Chris Pine as Roger Karos, an eccentric millionaire wanted by the FBI. Pine went uncredited for the role.
 Ed Helms as Karl, a successful limo driver who took his own life. He appears as a hallucination to Stretch.
 Jessica Alba as Charlie, a receptionist at Stretch's limo company and one of his few friends.
 James Badge Dale as Laurent, an FBI agent attempting to capture Karos.
 Brooklyn Decker as Candace, Stretch's ex-girlfriend.
 Ben Bray as Ignacio, a bookmaker whom Stretch owes money to.
 Randy Couture as the Jovi, a rival chauffeur.
 Matt Willig as Boris, the Jovi's fearsome brother and a tow truck driver.
 Shaun Toub as Nasseem, Stretch's boss.

Ray Liotta, David Hasselhoff, Norman Reedus, and Shaun White appear as themselves. Christopher Michael Holley plays Caesar, a door manager who has an altercation with Stretch. Jason Mantzoukas portrays Manny, a valet. Keith Jardine makes an appearance as a doorman.

Production 
Filming began in July 2013.

Release 
The film was originally set to be theatrically released in the United States on March 21, 2014. On January 21, 2014, the film's March release was scrapped by Universal Pictures, in what The Hollywood Reporter called "an apparently unprecedented move." The film's producer, Jason Blum, was unable to interest other distributors in the film, so it reverted to Universal Pictures, who were unwilling to spend the $20–40 million it would take to promote and release the film theatrically.

The film was released on iTunes and Amazon.com on October 7, 2014, before being released via VOD on October 14, 2014. To coincide with the film's on-demand release, the filmmakers released a behind-the-scenes video showing  the two leads Wilson and Decker going through the mechanics of filming a sex scene in the movie. This release received media attention.

Reception
Rotten Tomatoes, a review aggregator, reports that 88% of 17 surveyed critics gave the film a positive review; the average rating is 6.5/10.

Jordan Hoffman of The Guardian wrote, "While the movie does eventually ramp up to a terrific purr, it hits plenty of speed bumps in its opening. There's a significant settling-in period (and some may just be unable to get on board at all), but it does settle in once the 'one night' begins."  Ignatiy Vishnevetsky of The A.V. Club rated it B− and called it "puerile, demented, and often funny".  Drew Taylor of Indiewire rated it B+ and called it a potential cult film if it can reach an adventurous audience.  Cliff Wheatley of IGN rated it 8.9/10 and called it "a snowball of carnage and comedy".  Scott Tobias of The Dissolve called it "an obnoxious cartoon version of Hollywood noir" that "confuses confidence and bravado for wit and fun".

References

External links
 
 

2014 films
2014 action comedy films
2014 action thriller films
2010s comedy thriller films
2010s crime comedy films
American action comedy films
American action thriller films
American comedy thriller films
American crime comedy films
Blumhouse Productions films
Films about actors
Films directed by Joe Carnahan
Films produced by Jason Blum
Films produced by Joe Carnahan
Films scored by Ludwig Göransson
Films with screenplays by Joe Carnahan
IM Global films
Universal Pictures films
2010s English-language films
2010s American films